The 10th Parachute Division (French: 10e Division Parachutiste, 10e D.P) was a formation of the French Army, part of the French Airborne Units. It consisted predominantly of infantry troops, and specialized in airborne combat and air assault. Established in 1956, it fought primarily in the Suez Crisis and the Algerian War. It was dissolved immediately after the Algiers putsch of 1961.

Composition 

On July 1, 1956, the 10e D.P. is created with the following units:

Support:
60th Headquarters company (60e CGQ)
60th Transmission company of (60e CT)
Platoon of Army Light Aviation (ALAT)
Transport group n°507 (GT 507)
60th Airborne Engineers Company (60e CGAP)
60th Divisional Maintenance company (60e CRD)
405th Medical company (405e CM)
60th Military logistics section (60e SRI)
Airborne infantry:
1st Foreign Parachute Regiment (1er REP)
1st Parachute Chasseur Regiment (1er RCP), replaced by the 9th Parachute Chasseur Regiment (9e RCP) in April 1960
2nd Colonial Infantry Parachute Regiment (2e RPC)
3rd Colonial Infantry Parachute Regiment (3e RPC)
13th Parachute Dragoon Regiment (13e RDP) (from July 1957)
6th Colonial Infantry Parachute Regiment (6e RPC) (from July 1957)
Airborne artillery
20th Parachute Artillery Group (20e GAP)

Note: On the 1 December 1958, the "Colonial infantry" was renamed "Marine infantry".

History

Operation Musketeer

Barely created, the 10e D.P. took part in the Suez Crisis in Egypt, in an operation named "Operation Musketeer". The 10e D.P was reinforced for this purpose with:
 One squadron of the 2nd Foreign Cavalry Regiment (2e R.E.C) comprising 148 men and 17 AMX-13.
 10 LVT Alligator with 40 men
 A platoon of 6 Delahaye jeeps with SS.10 anti-tank missiles
 The 453rd anti-aircraft artillery group (453e GAAL): 803 men

On 5 November 1956, elements of the 10e D.P. were dropped on Port Fuad and Port Said, completed the next morning by amphibious assaults on both towns. Although the battle was a military success, allied troops had to withdraw due to pressure from the United States.

Battle of Algiers

In Algiers, the National Liberation Front (FLN) was carrying out a wave of terrorist attacks an urban guerilla which made many casualties, mostly Muslim civilians. In January 1957, Robert Lacoste, Minister Resident in Algeria, reacted by giving full powers to General Massu over the Algiers area. Massu sent the 10e D.P. to search out, arrest and question FLN members. The battle of Algiers proved to be a clear success for the French military, with most prominent FLN leaders killed or arrested and terrorist attacks effectively stopped. However, the use of torture against some FLN members led to an increasing opposition to war in France and internationally.

Battle of the Frontiers
In 1956, the newly independent Republic of Tunisia was helping the FLN by smuggling weapons and men through its territory. The electrified fence known as the Morice Line was built up to prevent Algerian FLN guerrillas from entering the French colony of Algeria from Tunisia. The 10e D.P. was assigned to the surveillance of a portion of the electrified border, in order to intercept rebel bands that have managed to cross it. The Morice Line had a significant impact of the reduction of guerrillas activities by forces that originated from Tunisia. However, general Massu, the commanding officer of the 10e D.P. was relieved of his command as he criticized president Charles de Gaulle's actions.

Algiers Putsch

Despite the military successes, French Prime Minister Michel Debré's government started secret negotiations with the anti-colonialist FLN in order to grant independence to Algeria. French settlers and soldiers were stunned by this decision and a putsch was organized in Algiers. With the exception of the 3e RPIMa, the rest of the 10e D.P. supported the coup. When the putsch failed the 25e D.P. along with the 10e D.P. were dissolved and the 1er R.E.P was the only regiment disbanded.

Traditions 

Except for the Legionnaires of the 1e REP who wear the Green Beret, the remainder of the French army metropolitan and marine paratroopers forming the 11th Parachute Brigade wear the Red Beret.

The Archangel Saint Michael, patron of the French paratroopers is celebrated on September 29.

The prière du Para (Prayer of the Paratrooper) was written by André Zirnheld in 1938.

Insignias 

Just like the paratrooper Brevet of the French Army; the Insignia of French Paratroopers was created in 1946. The French Army Insignia of metropolitan Paratroopers represents a closed "winged armed dextrochere", meaning a "right winged arm" armed with a sword pointing upwards. The Insignia makes reference to the Patron of Paratroopers. In fact, the Insignia represents "the right Arm of Saint Michael", the Archangel which according to Liturgy is the "Armed Arm of God". This Insignia is the symbol of righteous combat and fidelity to superior missions. The French Army Insignia of Marine Infantry Paratroopers is backgrounded by a Marine Anchor.

See also

Airborne Units of France
25th Parachute Division
11th Parachute Brigade
Pierre Côme André Segrétain
Pierre Paul Jeanpierre
Barthélémy Rémy Raffali
Paul Arnaud de Foïard
Hélie de Saint Marc
Georges Hamacek

References

External links 
History of the 1st Parachute Chasseur Regiment, 9th Parachute Chasseur Regiment, 14th Parachute Chasseur Regiment and 18th Parachute Chasseur Regiment

Airborne divisions of France
Military units and formations established in 1956
Military units and formations disestablished in 1961
1956 establishments in France
1961 disestablishments in France